The 2008 AFF Championship was the seventh edition of the tournament. It was primarily sponsored by Suzuki and therefore officially known as the 2008 AFF Suzuki Cup. The group stage was held in Indonesia and Thailand from 5 to 10 December 2008. Two-legged home-and-away semi-finals and finals were held between 16 and 28 December 2008.

Singapore were the defending champions, but were eliminated by Vietnam in the semi-finals. Vietnam won the tournament by a 3–2 victory in the two-legged final against Thailand to win their first title.

Summary 
The tournament would originally have been hosted by Myanmar because of the rotation system among ASEAN countries, however, they withdrew in August 2007 due to security concerns. In the third AFF council meeting in Bali, Indonesia and Thailand beat three other countries to win the right to host (the other three were Malaysia, Myanmar and Vietnam). However, if both countries are unable to fulfill certain obligations set by the ASEAN Football Federation (AFF), Vietnam will step in and host the tournament. The winning team will take home USD100,000, runners-up USD 50,000, and USD 15,000 for the losing semi-finalists. Nike will be an official supplier for the 2008 AFF Championship.

10 days before the start of the tournament, safety issues were raised contending the safety of the teams who were due to play in Bangkok. This was because of the riots that were happening in the city which also resulted in the closure of the Suvarnabhumi Airport (see 2008 Thai political crisis for further information). Due to the political crisis, the Football Association of Thailand stated that the Group Stages in the Thai capital Bangkok would go ahead, or if the situation got worse, games would be moved to Chiang Mai in the north of the country or Phuket in the South of the country.

As well as Thailand confirming themselves as steady hosts, Vietnam and Malaysia also stated that they would be prepared to host the tournament at short notice.

On 29 November, with less than one week before the start of the tournament, the group stages held in Thai sport were moved from the capital Bangkok to the southern province Phuket.

Venues 
Indonesia prepare Gelora Bung Karno Stadium in the capital city and Si Jalak Harupat Stadium in Bandung, while Thailand prepare Rajamangala Stadium and Suphachalasai Stadium where both of them located in Bangkok. All of the stadiums are 2007 AFC Asian Cup venues except of Si Jalak Harupat Stadium. Bung Karno Stadium will be the opening match venue, while Rajmangala Stadium will be the final match venue.

Group stage matches in Thai sport were switched from the capital Bangkok to the southern provinces Phuket at Surakul Stadium in Phuket City on 29 November due to security issues in Bangkok.

Qualification 

The qualification took place in Phnom Penh, the capital of Cambodia, from 17 October 2008 to 25 October 2008. The five lower-ranked teams in Southeast Asia play within a round-robin tournament format and the top two countries in the group will qualify for this tournament.

Qualified teams 
The following eight teams qualified for the tournament.

Squads

Referees 
Confirmed referees during the tournament:

  Mohamed Hadimin
  Midi Setiyono
  Mohd Nafeez Abdul Wahab
  Ramachandran Krishnan
  Subkhiddin Mohd Salleh
  Win Cho

  Allan Martinez
  Malik Abdul Bashir
  Pandian Palaniyandi
  Chaiya Mahapab
  Phùng Đình Dũng
  Võ Minh Trí

Final tournament

Group stage

Group A 

 All matches played in Indonesia.
 All times are Western Indonesian Time (WIB) – UTC+7.

Group B 

 All Matches played in Thailand.
 All times are Indochina Time (ICT) – UTC+7

Knockout stages 

Note: Although the knockout stages are two-legged, away goals rule is not applied. If the total aggregate score of both teams after both matches remained the same, extra time would have been played, followed by a penalty shootout if necessary.

Semi-finals 
First Leg

Second Leg

Thailand won 3–1 on aggregate.

Vietnam won 1–0 on aggregate.

Final 

First leg

Second leg

Vietnam won 3–2 on aggregate.

Awards

Goalscorers 

4 goals

  Budi Sudarsono
  Agu Casmir
  Teerasil Dangda

3 goals

  Indra Putra Mahayuddin
  Nguyễn Vũ Phong

2 goals

  Bambang Pamungkas
  Safee Sali
  Myo Min Tun
  Noh Alam Shah
  Anon Sangsanoi
  Arthit Sunthornpit
  Sutee Suksomkit
  Ronnachai Rangsiyo
  Lê Công Vinh
  Phạm Thành Lương

1 goal

  Khim Borey
  Kouch Sokumpheak
  Firman Utina
  Nova Arianto
  Moe Win
  Ya Zar Win Thein
  Indra Sahdan Daud
  Fahrudin Mustafić
  Baihakki Khaizan
  Shi Jiayi
  Suchao Nuchnum
  Patiparn Phetphun
  Teerathep Winothai
  Nguyễn Việt Thắng
  Huỳnh Quang Thanh
  Phan Thanh Bình
  Nguyễn Quang Hải

1 own goal

  Dương Hồng Sơn

Team statistics 
This table shows all team performance.

References 

 
AFF Championship tournaments
1
2008–09 in Indonesian football
2008 in Thai football
2008
2008
2008 in Cambodian football
2008 in Vietnamese football
2008 in Laotian football
2008 in Malaysian football
2008 in Burmese football
2008 in Singaporean football